Seneca (formerly, North Fork) is an unincorporated community in Plumas County, California. It lies at an elevation of 3625 feet (1105 m).

The Seneca post office opened in 1902, closed in 1918, reopened in 1923, moved in 1941, and closed finally in 1943.

In 2013, the owners of the 12 acres comprising Seneca were offering it for sale, at a price of $225,000.

References

Unincorporated communities in California
Unincorporated communities in Plumas County, California